Mahmudābād Šahāb is a village in Khomeh Rural District, in the Central District of Aligudarz County, Lorestan Province, Iran. At the 2006 census, its population was 207, in 35 families.

References 

Towns and villages in Aligudarz County